Lawrence Richard Hardy (born 1913) was an English professional footballer who played as an inside right.

Career
Born in South Bank, Hardy played for South Bank East End, Hartlepools United, Bradford City and Shrewsbury Town.

For Bradford City he made 12 appearances in the Football League.

Sources

References

1913 births
Year of death missing
English footballers
Hartlepool United F.C. players
Bradford City A.F.C. players
Shrewsbury Town F.C. players
English Football League players
Association football inside forwards